Henry Edward Burnett (born 1998) is an English professional footballer who plays as a midfielder for Isthmian League Premier League club Billericay Town.

Career
Burnett started his career at Dagenham & Redbridge before an anterior cruciate ligament injury ruled him out for two-and-a-half years.

He joined Southend United on a year-long deal in 2019, before joining Tonbridge Angels on loan in January 2020. He made 3 appearances in the league for Tonbridge Angels, but was released by Southend United at the end of the 2019–20 season.

On 13 October 2020, Burnett signed a one-year contract with EFL League Two side Crawley Town. On 11 March 2022, Burnett joined National League South side Welling United on loan for the remainder of the 2021–22 season. Burnett was released by Crawley at the end of the 2021–22 season.

Following his release, Burnett joined Billericay Town.

Career statistics

References

Living people
English footballers
Association football midfielders
Southend United F.C. players
Tonbridge Angels F.C. players
Crawley Town F.C. players
Welling United F.C. players
Billericay Town F.C. players
National League (English football) players
1998 births